Buena Vista High School was a public high school located at 3945 East Holland in Buena Vista Charter Township, Michigan and was part of the former Buena Vista School District. The school was closed when the Buena Vista School District was dissolved in July 2013. Buena Vista's mascot was the Knights, and its colors were blue and white. The school's athletic program competed in the Greater Thumb Conference as a Class C, and later in the Highland Conference as a Class D school.

Closure
The school was closed, along with all other schools in the Buena Vista School District, after the district was dissolved when it missed a deadline to find loans or extra funding by July 22, 2013. With no loans or other funding available, the state ordered that the district be dissolved. On July 30, 2013, the Saginaw Intermediate School District Board of Trustees officially dissolved Buena Vista Schools. The Buena Vista District area was split up between three other districts: Saginaw Public School District, Bridgeport-Spaulding Community School District, and Frankenmuth School District.

The Saginaw Public School District acquired the Buena Vista headquarters building and all five school buildings, including Buena Vista High School. The offer was later rescinded.

References

Public high schools in Michigan
Schools in Saginaw County, Michigan
Saginaw Intermediate School District